Prakash Dwivedi is an Indian politician and a member of 17th Legislative Assembly, Uttar Pradesh of India. He represents the ‘Banda Sadar’ constituency in Banda district of Uttar Pradesh. His father's name is Ramyash Dwivedi (nanna).

Political career
Prakash Dwivedi has got 83169 votes whereas Madhusudan Kushwaha has got 50341 votes. Vivek Kumar Singh, member of Indian National Congress received 32223 votes and got third position in Uttar Pradesh Pradesh assembly elections 2017. Total 165733 voters have used their voting rights to cast their votes for Bharatiya Janata Party, Bahujan Samaj Party and Indian National Congress and Bharatiya Janata Party is winner by 32828 votes in UP assembly elections 2017 from seat of Uttar Pradesh.

Prakash Dwivedi contested Uttar Pradesh Assembly Election as Bharatiya Janata Party candidate and defeated his close contestant Madhusudan Kushwaha from Bahujan Samaj Party with a margin of 32,828 votes.

During 2017 Assembly Election, former Congress Minister Vivek Kumar Singh (who had been opponent of Prakash Dwivedi from Banda Assembly Constituency) had also filed a petition in the Allahabad High Court and claimed that he had deliberately hidden some of his criminal cases in the affidavit submitted with his Election nomination papers. The High Court had also issued notice to him in this regard.

Posts held

References
6 Uttar Pradesh Upbhokta Sahakari Sangh Ltd.  -upupbhoktasangh.com

Uttar Pradesh MLAs 2017–2022
Living people
Year of birth missing (living people)
Uttar Pradesh MLAs 2022–2027